The Roman Catholic Diocese of Makeni is a diocese in the Ecclesiastical province of Freetown in Sierra Leone. The Cathedral is the Our Lady of Fatima Cathedral in Makeni.

In 2012 a majority of priests in the diocese disagreed with the appointment of bishop Henry Aruna, after which sede vacante was declared in April 2012.

History
 April 3, 1952: Established as Apostolic Prefecture of Makeni from territory of the Diocese of Freetown and Bo
 February 24, 1962: Elevated to the status of a diocese

Ordinaries

 Prefect Apostolic of Makeni (Latin Church) 
 Augusto Fermo Azzolini (1952-07-19 – 1962-02-24 see below)
 Bishops of Makeni (Latin Church)
 Augusto Fermo Azzolini (see above 1962-02-24 – 1986-11-17)
 George Biguzzi (1986-11-17 - 2012-01-07)
 Henry Aruna (2012-01-07 -  2012-04-11), did not take possession
 Sede vacante  (2012-04-11 - present)

See also
Roman Catholicism in Sierra Leone

Sources
 GCatholic.org
 Catholic Hierarchy

Catholic Church in Sierra Leone
Makeni
Christian organizations established in 1952
Roman Catholic dioceses and prelatures established in the 20th century
1952 establishments in Sierra Leone
Makeni